Sianne Avantie, (born in Semarang, 20 May 1965) better known as Anne Avantie is an Indonesian fashion designer and contemporary kebaya pioneer. Her kebaya has been known on an international scale and is often worn by Indonesian models and celebrities, also a number of beauty queens who have come to Indonesia, one of which is Miss Universe.

Early life and career 

Born in Semarang, 20 May 1965 and later spent his childhood in the city of Surakarta, Central Java. She is the eldest of three children of Hary Alexander and Amie Indarti. Anne Avantie is married to Yoseph Henry Susilo (her 2nd husband) and is the mother of 3 children. First, Intan Avantie is married to Christinus and has one child, Matthew Archiello Keenant Wijasena. Anne's second and third children are all male, namely Ernest Christoga Susilo and Ian Tadio Christoga Susilo.

Since childhood, Anne Avantie has shown an interest in the world of fashion. In 1989, Anne started her career as a fashion designer from a rented house with 2 sewing machines as capital. The first place of business was named "Griya Busana Permatasari". Until 2010, Anne had two boutiques at Mall Kelapa Gading and "Roémah Pengantén", in Grand Indonesia. In addition, Anne also has a shop called "Pendopo" which sells domestic art products made by small and medium enterprises (SMEs).

Anne Avantie also runs several non-profit communities for the ills and down syndrome kids.

References

External links 
 
 Anne Avantie Mall

Living people
1965 births
People from Semarang
Indonesian Roman Catholics
Indonesian fashion designers
Indonesian women fashion designers
Indonesian people of Chinese descent
Indonesian Christians